Briar Palmer (born 1 July 1995) is a New Zealand football striker who plays for Melbourne Victory in the W-League, the top-division women's soccer league in Australia.

Playing career

Club
Palmer signed with Melbourne Victory for the 2015–16 W-League season. She made her debut for the club during the team's first match of the season on 17 October 2015. Palmer made eight appearances for the club with five starts during the 2015–16 W-League season. The Victory finished in ninth place with a  record.

International
Palmer has represented New Zealand at the under-17 and under-20 levels, including at the 2012 FIFA U-17 Women's World Cup and 2014 FIFA U-20 Women's World Cup. At the 2012 OFC Women's Under 17 Qualifying Tournament, she scored two goals against Cook Islands helping New Zealand win 7–0.

References

External links
 
 

Living people
1995 births
New Zealand women's association footballers
Melbourne Victory FC (A-League Women) players
A-League Women players
Women's association football forwards